Louise-Honorine, Duchesse de Choiseul (1734 – 1801) was the duchess of Choiseul as the wife of Étienne François. She was the heiress of the grand fortune left by her grandfather Antoine Crozat.

Life 
Louise-Honorine de Crozat was the daughter of Louis François Crozart—the son of proprietary owner Antoine Crozat. At the age of 12, Louise-Honorine was  betrothed to Étienne François, and the two married in 1750. The marriage was described as a happy one, despite Étienne's many liaisons.

Louise-Honorine was described as being tender-hearted and dignified, and as a devoted wife. Her kind demeanor caused Horace Walpole to claim: "The most perfect being of either sex. Nothing that I ever saw anywhere was like the Duchess of Choiseul, who has more parts, reason and agreeableness than I ever met in such a delicate little creature. You would take her for the Queen of an Allegory."

During the French Revolution, Louise-Honorine was held captive in 1794, awaiting her death by guillotine in the Conciergerie; before her execution, however, the party of Robespierre fell and she was then let free. She would later die in 1801, aged 66–67, outliving her husband, whom had died in 1785, by nearly 16 years.

She was buried in the Cimetière d'Amboise, in France.

References 

1734 births
1801 deaths
18th-century French people
18th-century French women